The Stockton Open was a golf tournament on the LPGA Tour, played only in 1952. It was played in Stockton, California. Louise Suggs won the event.

References

Former LPGA Tour events
Golf in California
Sports competitions in Stockton, California
Women's sports in California
1952 in sports in California